Thomas Joseph Leahy (June 2, 1869 – June 11, 1951) was a professional baseball player. He played all or part of four seasons in Major League Baseball, between 1897 and 1905, for the Pittsburgh Pirates, the Washington Senators, the Milwaukee Brewers, the Philadelphia Athletics, and the St. Louis Cardinals, primarily as a catcher.

Sources

Major League Baseball catchers
Pittsburgh Pirates players
Washington Senators (1891–1899) players
Milwaukee Brewers (1901) players
Philadelphia Athletics players
St. Louis Cardinals players
Springfield Ponies players
Springfield Maroons players
Providence Clamdiggers (baseball) players
Providence Grays (minor league) players
Troy Washerwomen players
San Francisco (minor league baseball) players
San Francisco Seals (baseball) players
Seattle Siwashes players
Kansas City Blues (baseball) players
Calumet Aristocrats players
Madison Senators players
Indianapolis Indians players
Baseball players from New Haven, Connecticut
1869 births
1951 deaths
19th-century baseball players